Divino is a Brazilian municipality located in the state of Minas Gerais. The city belongs to the mesoregion of Zona da Mata and to the microregion of Muriaé. Divino is 350 km away from the capital of the state of Minas Gerais.

Divino was founded on 25 January 1939. It is a beautiful city with wonderful waterfalls and big farms. The economy is based on agriculture, especially coffee crops and milk.

Its area is 338,716 km2. As of 2020, it has an estimated population of 19,976 inhabitants.

References

Municipalities in Minas Gerais